This is a summary of sports lists of athletes from Albania, Kosovo, Montenegro, North Macedonia and the region.

Athletes by sport
 Footballers
 Weightlifters
 Wrestlers
 Martial Artists
 Boxers
 Swimmers
 Cyclists
 Gymnasts
 Basketball Players
 Volleyball Players
 Alpine Skiers
 Chess Players
 Pistol Shooters

References